Phlyctaenogastra familia is a moth in the family Erebidae. It was described by Lars Kühne in 2010. It is known from Namibia.

References

Endemic fauna of Namibia
Moths described in 2010
Spilosomina